Miller Mountain may refer to:

 Miller Mountain (Alabama)
 Miller Mountain (Carroll County, Arkansas)
 Miller Mountain (Stone County, Arkansas)
 Miller Mountain (Washington County, Arkansas)
 Miller Mountain (Mohave County, Arizona)
 Miller Mountain (Washington County, Arizona)
 Miller Mountain (Monterey County, California)
 Miller Mountain (San Diego County, California)
 Miller Mountain (Shasta County, California)
 Miller Mountain (Siskiyou County, California)
 Miller Mountain (Colorado)
 Miller Mountain (Idaho)
 Miller Mountain (Nevada) in the Candelaria Hills
 Miller Mountain (Maine)
 Miller Mountain in Mineral County, Montana
 Miller Mountain (Park County, Montana)
 Miller Mountain (Blair County, Pennsylvania)
 Miller Mountain (Wyoming County, Pennsylvania)